FLEX is a discontinued single-tasking operating system developed by Technical Systems Consultants (TSC) of West Lafayette, Indiana, for the Motorola 6800 in 1976.

Overview
The original version was distributed on 8" floppy disks; the (smaller) version for 5.25" floppies is called mini-Flex. It was also later ported to the Motorola 6809; that version is called Flex09. All versions are text-based and intended for use on display devices ranging from printing terminals like the Teletype Model 33 ASR to smart terminals. While no graphic displays are supported by TSC software, some hardware supports elementary graphics and pointing devices.

FLEX is a disk-based operating system, using 256-byte sectors on soft-sectored floppies; the disk structure uses linkage bytes in each sector to indicate the next sector in a file or free list. The directory structure is  simplified as a result. TSC (and others) provide several programming languages including BASIC in two flavors (standard and extended) and a tokenizing version of extended BASIC called Pre-compiled BASIC, FORTH, C, FORTRAN, and PASCAL.

TSC also wrote a version of FLEX, Smoke Signal DOS, for the California hardware manufacturer Smoke Signal Broadcasting; this version uses forward and reverse linkage bytes in each sector which increase disk reliability at the expense of compatibility and speed.

Later, TSC introduced the multitasking, multi-user, Unix-like UniFLEX operating system, which requires DMA disk controllers, 8" disk, and sold in small numbers. Several of the TSC computer languages were ported to UniFLEX.

During the early 1980s, FLEX was offered by Compusense Ltd as an operating system for the 6809-based Dragon 64 home computer.

Commands
The following commands are supported by different versions of the FLEX operating system.

 APPEND
 ASN
 BACKUP
 BUILD
 CAT
 COPY
 COPYNEW
 C4MAT
 CLEAN
 DATE
 DELETE
 ECHO
 EXEC
 FIX
 GET
 I
 JUMP
 LINK
 LIST
 MEMTEST1
 MON
 N
 NEWDISK
 O
 P
 P.COR
 PO
 PRINT
 PROT
 PSP
 Q
 QCHECK
 READPROM
 RENAME
 RM
 S
 SAVE
 SAVE.LOW
 SBOX
 SP
 STARTUP
 TOUCH
 TTYSET
 UCAL
 USEMF
 VER
 VERIFY
 VERSION
 WRITPROM
 XOUT
 Y

See also
Microsoft BASIC-68 for FLEX
Microsoft BASIC-69 for FLEX

References

External links
 FLEX User Group
 FLEX User Group
 SWTPC 6800 FLEX 2 and 6809 FLEX 9 / UniFLEX / OS9 Level 1 emulator
 Windows-based 6809 Emulator + Flex09 and 6809 applications
 AmigaDOS-based 6809 Emulator + Flex09 and 6809 applications
 The Missing 6809 UniFLEX Archive
 DragonWiki
 SWTPC documentation collection 
 FLEX Software Archive

Discontinued operating systems
Disk operating systems
TRS-80 Color Computer
1976 software